18th Congress may refer to
18th Congress of the All-Union Communist Party (Bolsheviks) (1939)
18th Congress of the Philippines (2019–2022)
18th National Congress of the Chinese Communist Party (2012)
18th National Congress of the Kuomintang (2009)
18th United States Congress (1823–1825)